Óluva Allansdóttir Joensen (born 21 April 2002) is a Faroese (Denmark) footballer who plays as a goalkeeper for 1. deild kvinnur club KÍ Klaksvík and the Faroe Islands women's national team.

References

2002 births
Living people
Faroese women's footballers
Women's association football goalkeepers
Faroe Islands women's youth international footballers
Faroe Islands women's international footballers
KÍ Klaksvík players